Valiya Chirakula Pakshikal is a 2015 Indian Malayalam drama film written and directed by Dr. Biju and produced by Dr. A.K. Pillai. It is based on an incident in a small village in Kasaragod in the state of Kerala where thousands of people were infected with fatal diseases due to the effects of endosulfan, a pesticide used to protect cashewnut trees.

The film was shot in Kerala and Canada, and was released in India in December 2015.

Plot
The film is a partly fictional representation of the environmental disaster caused by the use of the pesticide endosulfan in the Kasaragod District of Kerala, India. This disaster was caused by nearly two and a half decades of endosulfan use on government-owned cashew plantations. The film explores the disastrous environmental and public health consequences of the use of the pesticide and the health-related effects that persist to this day.

The film depicts the after-effects of pesticide spraying through the eyes of a photographer. His first visit to the area was during a rainy season in 2001, and his photographs revealed the shocking state of the numerous victims to the world. Endosulfan-induced misery gained worldwide attention as a result of these photographs. When the photographer visited the area again in the summer of 2006, many of the young victims he had photographed during his earlier visit, had died. Even now, children are being affected with strange and debilitating diseases. In 2011, the Stockholm Summit of UN on Persistent Organic Pollutants (POP) recommended a total ban on endosulfan. India was the only country that opposed this decision. A year later, in 2012, the photographer returned to Kasaragod and found that the plight of these victims persisted, and that the survivors continued to suffer.

Realities
The main character is based Madhuraj a Mathrubhumi press photojournalist whose 2001 exposé shed light on the environmental damage that resulted from the use of endosulfan. tragedy. To maintain authenticity, and to depict events accurately, Dr. Biju consulted Madhuraj and other activists associated with the Kasaragod issue. It took nearly a year for the director to conduct this research. In a bid to give a voice to those affected by this man-made, environmental crisis, the characters that appear in the film are played by real-life victims.

Valiya Chirakulla Pakshikals viewpoint is that a grave injustice has been perpetrated on a people by its government. It relates the story of twenty-five years of what is described as blatant disregard for the well-being of a community, and of sacrificing lives in the pursuit of greed. In spite of overwhelming evidence, the filmmaker maintains that the Indian government has not completely stopped the usage of endosulfan, nor have victims have not been provided access to proper treatment, or allowed due compensation. Although the United Nations has banned endosulfan, the decision to ban this pesticide in Kasaragod fell to the Supreme Court of India. During the time of the decision-making, the production company, crew, and actors joined hands in a how of support for the ban.

On his decision to take the lead role, actor Kunchacko Boban stated, "It was such a sensitive script, to which no actor could have said no. The shoot was a moving experience, and for the first time, I cried without glycerine on the sets. What we have read or seen about the ordeal of Endosulfan victims is nothing when you meet them face to face and hear them out. It was too traumatic and emotional. Never did I undergo such trauma while shooting."

Cast

 Kunchacko Boban as Photographer.
 Nedumudi Venu as Chief Editor
 Suraj Venjaramoodu as Minister
 Salim Kumar as School Head Master
 James Bradford as French Environment Scientist
 Prakash Bare as Dr. Mohankumar
 Thampi Antony as Avinash
 Krishnan Balakrishnan as Villager 
 Sajeev Pillai as Government Secretary of Agriculture attending Stockholm Conference
 Krishnaprasad as Reporter Venukumar
 Jayakrishnan as Father
 Dr Muhammed Asheel as Doctor attending Stockholm Conference
 Sasi Paravur as Supreme Court Justice
 M.A. Nishad as Lawyer of DYFI
 Anumol as Environment Activist attending Stockholm Conference
 Patricia Leduc as Chairperson, Stockholm Conference
 Master Govardhan as Photographers' childhood
 Sree Pedre as Sree Pedre
 Leelakumari Amma as Leelakumari Amma 
 Many real-life endosulfan victims

Production

The film was produced by Dr. A.K. Pillai, under the Maya Movies production house banner. Pillai is a practicing pediatrician currently living in Florida, USA. Pillai obtained postgraduate degrees from the UK and the USA, and worked for the US Government for few years before starting his own private practice. His passion for making realistic and meaningful movies led to him joining forces with contemporary artistic filmmaker Dr. Biju. The film is co-produced by Padma Pillai.

Filming
The shooting schedule lasted a year in Kasaragod and Canada, in order to capture the nuances of the four seasons. The first scheduled shoot began in June 2014, in Kasaragod, to capture the monsoon. A number of children who were the actual victims of the pesticide appeared in the film at this time.

The second shoot was completed in the spring at Kasaragod, in September 2014. During the shooting, people continued to strike, demanding justice from the Government for the endosulfan victims. Protests were also recreated with major participation from the areas' mothers and children.

The third shoot was completed in Ottawa, Canada, during the winter in December 2014. CanEast films (Biju George and Satheesh Gopalan) in Ottawa, Canada, coordinated the Canadian part of shoot. The Ottawa Film Office, extended support for the production crew. Nearly 100 local actors were called upon to recreat the UN conference on persistent organic pollutants (POPs), including actor James Bradford, who played the role of a French environmental scientist. The film crew struggled to shoot most of the outdoor sequences in wintry conditions and -20 °C weather. Despite the harsh climate, shooting was wrapped in less than two weeks due to the overwhelming support from CanEast Films, the local crew and the Ottawa Film Office.

The fourth shoot took place in Kasaragod to capture the summer in February and March 2015.

Release
The world premiere of the film is planned for September/October 2015 at a major film festival outside India. The Indian and Kerala release was released on 4 December 2015.

Festivals/Awards/Nominations

Post film activities for the victims
After the completion of film shoot, the film crew continued their activities for supporting the Endosulfan victims. The local people and  activists started a charitable organization called SNEHAM''' for the support of victims, with support from the crew. Actor Kunchacko Boban, along with SNEHAM volunteers, participated in the popular television program Kodeeswaran'' to raise money for the organization. In addition, the producer, director, and technical crew are continuing to support the cause, and aim to build a rehabilitation village to support and care for victims.

References

External links
 
 
 Madhuraj's website

2015 films
2010s Malayalam-language films
Indian docudrama films
Environmental films
Films directed by Dr. Biju
Toxic effects of pesticides
Best Film on Environment Conservation/Preservation National Film Award winners